"Lockdown Blues" is a single by Danish art punk band Iceage. The standalone single was released on 2 April 2020 through Escho.

Background 

The song was written, recorded, and released during the COVID-19 pandemic and touches on the reality of quarantine and the sense of anxiety and loneliness associated with quarantine. In a statement on the song, they state that "we’ve felt the urge to touch base now that the physical touch has been suspended and contribute an effort to raise spirits in the face of adversity. Our thoughts are with all those in jeopardy to the many various horrors in relation to the crisis, those situated on the front lines and those who are direly compromised."

Proceeds from the song's sales went to Doctors Without Borders.

Recording 
The song was recorded in March 2020 at Black Tornado Studios in Copenhagen, Denmark.

Critical reception 
Spin Magazine writer, David Kohn called the "Lockdown" an urgent song with driving guitars.

Personnel 
 Songwriting – Iceage
 Performance – Iceage
 Production – Iceage
 Recording Engineering – Lars Lundholm
 Mixing – Nis Bysted
 Mastering – ET Mastering

References 

2020 singles
2020 songs
Charity singles
Iceage songs
Matador Records singles
Song recordings produced by Nis Bysted
Songs about the COVID-19 pandemic